Sunken Meadow State Park, also known as Governor Alfred E. Smith State Park, is a  state park located in the Town of Smithtown in Suffolk County, New York on the north shore of Long Island. The park, accessible via the Sunken Meadow State Parkway, contains the 27-hole Sunken Meadow State Park Golf Course.

Park description

Sunken Meadow State Park is open year-round from sunrise to sunset. The park's features include  of beaches on the Long Island Sound, a  boardwalk,  of hiking trails, and facilities for biking, horseback riding, watersports, and general recreation. Playgrounds, softball fields, and a soccer fields are also available at the park. A wedding and event facility known as "The Pavilion" is available during the summer.

The Sunken Meadow State Park Golf Course features 27 holes that may be played as either nine or 18 holes, in addition to a driving range and putting green. The first two nine-hole courses, Red and Green, were built in 1962, followed by the Blue Course in 1964. All three courses were designed by Alfred Tull. A bar and snack food restaurant near the course is available and open to the public.

The park's grounds are used as a venue for cross country running, and host competitions for cross country teams from local high schools and runners' clubs. The five-kilometer course, featuring the deliberately named "Cardiac Hill", is regarded as one of the most difficult cross country courses in the US.

The  Long Island Greenbelt Trail connects Sunken Meadow State Park with Heckscher State Park.

See also
 List of New York state parks

References

External links
 
 New York State Parks: Governor Alfred E. Smith/Sunken Meadow State Park
 Long Island's Favorite Running Locations: Sunken Meadow State Park
  New York-New Jersey Trail Conference: Sunken Meadow State Park

State parks of New York (state)
Robert Moses projects
Long Island Sound
Smithtown, New York
Parks in Suffolk County, New York
Meadows in the United States